Groggan is a hamlet and townland near Randalstown in County Antrim, Northern Ireland. It is situated in the historic barony of Toome Upper and the civil parish of Drummaul and covers an area of 620 acres. It is within the Borough of Antrim. 

Groggan had a population of 135 people (54 households) in the 2011 Census. (2001 Census: 123 people). The population of the townland declined overall during the 19th century:

See also
List of townlands in County Antrim

References 

Villages in County Antrim
Civil Parish of Drummaul
Townlands of County Antrim